Arthur Ashe won the singles title of the 1972 Rotterdam Indoors defeating Tom Okker in the final 3–6, 6–2, 6–1. Mark Cox won the match for third place against John Newcombe 6–3, 6–4.

Seeds

  John Newcombe (semifinals)
  Arthur Ashe (champion)
  Tom Okker (final)
  Robin Drysdale (quarterfinals)
  Mark Cox (semifinals)
  Robert Lutz (quarterfinals)
  Marty Riessen (quarterfinals)
  Nikola Pilić (first round)

Draw

Finals

Top half

Bottom half

External links
 Main draw

Singles